Petalax is a former municipality in Ostrobothnia.  The municipality was incorporated in Malax municipality in 1973.
Approximately 1,200 people live in Petalax and the main language is Swedish.

References 

Municipalities of Finland